This is a partial list of notable Kumyk people.

Statesmen and military

16-17th centuries 

  — prominent leader and ruler, Shamkhal, who defeated Russian invasion of the Eastern Caucasus at the Battle of Karaman, stopping it for a few decades.

18-19th centuries 

  — political, military, and spiritual leader of Caucasian resistance in the 1800s, second to Imam Shamil
 Uchar-hadzhi — 19th century mulla and elderman, who killed two Russian generals at once

20th century 

 Abdulhakim Ismailov — USSR World War II soldier, he was photographed by Yevgeny Khaldei raising the USSR flag over the Reichstag in Berlin on 2 May 1945, days before Nazi Germany's surrender

Scholars and writers 

  — prominent French-Afghan writer, linguist, and Islamic scholar
 İzzet Kantemir — prominent Turkish writer, translator, public figure and medical professor
  — Turkish historian and writer

Scientists 

  — radio communication engineer, Chief Constructor of Molniya communication satellite systems, which was developed in Sergei Korolev's design centre

Politicians 

 Ahmed-Saib bey Kaplan —one of the prominent members of Young Turks movement, dissident of Sultan Abdülhamid II and his absolute rule and one of the writers and historians of the Late Ottoman Empire
  — politician, one of the ideologists and Foreign Minister of the Mountainous Republic of the Northern Caucasus, who officially proclaimed its independence on 11 May 1918, author of "Visages de l'Islam", Afghanistan's diplomatic appointee in Switzerland.
 Rashid Khan Kaplanov — politician, one of the founders and Minister of Internal Affairs of the Mountainous Republic of the Northern Caucasus, then Minister of Education and Religious Affairs in the fifth and fourth cabinets of Azerbaijan Democratic Republic
  — de facto the founder of the Soviet Republic of Dagestan, its first First Secretary
 Roza Eldarova — the first woman to hold the highest political office in Dagestan, elected chairwoman of the Presidium of the Supreme Soviet of the Dagestan Autonomous Soviet Socialist Republic in March 1962
 Ümit Özdağ  —  a Turkish politician of Kumyk origin and current Member of the Grand National Assembly of Turkey.

Artists and architects 

 Murad ad-Dagistani — pioneering Iraqi photographer, achieved international recognition for the quality of his photographs which recorded scenes of every-day life and people
 Nasreddin Murat-Khan — Pakistani architect and civil engineer. He is remembered most for designing the national monument, the Minar-e-Pakistan

Sports

Wrestling

Edge of 19-20th centuries
  — six-time world wrestling champion

20th century
 Saypulla Absaidov – 1980 Moscow Olympics wrestling champion in Lightweight category
Magomedgasan Abushev — 1980 Moscow Olympics wrestling champion in 62 kg category, 1980 Prievidza European champion

21st century
 Marid Mutalimov —  2008 Summer Olympics wrestling bronze medalist in 120 kg category
 Bakhtiyar Akhmedov — 2008 Summer Olympics wrestling champion in 120 kg category
Nariman Israpilov — 2009 Vilnius wrestling European champion in 55 kg category, 2013 Budapest world championship bronze medalist in 55 kg category
Zaur Uguev — 2020 Summer Olympics wrestling champion in 57 kg freestyle category, 2018 Budapest and 2019 Nur-Sultan wrestling world champion in 57 kg category
Milana Dadasheva — bronze medalist of two wrestling European Championships

Martial arts 
  — wushu star and actor, 12-time European and 1-time world wushu champion
Bozigit Ataev — many-time Wushu Sanda world champion.
Muslim Salikhov — many-time Wushu Sanda world champion, "King of King-fu", often acknowledged as one of the best Wushu Sanda competitors in history
Marat Gafurov — world pankration (2010) and jiu-jitsu (2013) champion
Rustam Khabilov — Combat Sambo World Champion, MMA fighter
Muhammad Mokaev — UK-based MMA fighter, IMMAF junior bantamweight world champion, UFC member.

Boxing 

 — light heavyweight titleholder among professionals under version WBC USNBC
Arslanbek Makhmudov — WBC-NABF champion

Football 

 Arsen Akayev — professional football player and coach
 Murad Magomedov — professional football player
 Alibek Aliev — professional Swedish football player
 Islamnur Abdulavov — professional football player
 Timerlan Huseynov — first scorer, who made 100 goals in the Ukrainian Football League

References 

Kumyks